Colfax is a city in Richland County, North Dakota, United States. The population was 172 at the 2020 census. Colfax was founded in 1881. It is part of the Wahpeton, ND–MN Micropolitan Statistical Area.  In the mid-1960s it billed itself as the "smallest town in the U.S. with a public swimming pool".

Geography
Colfax is located at  (46.469999, -96.875426).

Demographics

2010 census
As of the census of 2010, there were 121 people, 46 households, and 36 families residing in the city. The racial makeup of the city was 100.0% White.

There were 46 households, of which 34.8% had children under the age of 18 living with them, 67.4% were married couples living together, 8.7% had a female householder with no husband present, 2.2% had a male householder with no wife present, and 21.7% were non-families. 19.6% of all households were made up of individuals, and 10.9% had someone living alone who was 65 years of age or older. The average household size was 2.63 and the average family size was 2.94.

The median age in the city was 37.4 years. 28.9% of residents were under the age of 18; 4.2% were between the ages of 18 and 24; 33.8% were from 25 to 44; 19.8% were from 45 to 64; and 13.2% were 65 years of age or older. The gender makeup of the city was 55.4% male and 44.6% female.

2000 census
As of the census of 2000, there were 91 people, 40 households, and 28 families residing in the city. The racial makeup of the city was 100.00% White. Hispanic or Latino of any race were 1.10% of the population.

There were 40 households, out of which 27.5% had children under the age of 18 living with them, 60.0% were married couples living together, 10.0% had a female householder with no husband present, and 30.0% were non-families. 27.5% of all households were made up of individuals, and 22.5% had someone living alone who was 65 years of age or older. The average household size was 2.28 and the average family size was 2.79.

In the city, the population was spread out, with 25.3% under the age of 18, 3.3% from 18 to 24, 29.7% from 25 to 44, 22.0% from 45 to 64, and 19.8% who were 65 years of age or older. The median age was 42 years. For every 100 females, there were 78.4 males. For every 100 females age 18 and over, there were 78.9 males.

The median income for a household in the city was $33,333, and the median income for a family was $55,833. Males had a median income of $28,333 versus $25,417 for females. The per capita income for the city was $19,635. There were no families and 7.0% of the population living below the poverty line, including no under eighteens and 12.5% of those over 64.

References

Cities in North Dakota
Cities in Richland County, North Dakota
Populated places established in 1881
Wahpeton micropolitan area
1881 establishments in Dakota Territory